Events from the year 1978 in Denmark.

Incumbents
 Monarch – Margrethe II
 Prime minister – Anker Jørgensen

Events
 19 September – The 1978 electoral age referendum, leading to a lowering of the electoral age from 20 to 18 years.

Undated

Sports

Badminton
 13–15 April — With two gold medals, two silver medals and one bronze medal, Denmark finishes as the second best nation at the 6th European Badminton Championships in Preston, England.
 Gentofte BK wins Europe Cup.

Cycling
 Donald Allan (AUS) and Danny Clark (AUS) win the Six Days of Copenhagen sox-day track cycling race.

Other
 2 September — Ole Olsen wins the 1978 Individual Speedway World Championship at Wembley Stadium in London.

Births
20 January – Britt Raaby, freestyle swimmer
3 April – Michael Gravgaard, football player
22 July – Dennis Rommedahl, football player

Deaths
1 March – Arne Sørensen, politician (born 1906)
19 May – Carl Hansen, footballer (born 1898)
22 June – Jens Otto Krag, politician, former Danish prime minister (born 1914)

See also
1978 in Danish television

References

 
Denmark
Years of the 20th century in Denmark
1970s in Denmark